Tipulamima hypocalla is a moth of the family Sesiidae. It is known from Angola.

References

Sesiidae
Moths described in 1937